Paul Sahre (born 1964) is an American graphic designer. He has designed book covers and created numerous  illustration for The New York Times.

Biography 
Sahre (pronounced say-er) was born in Johnson City in upstate New York, and received his BFA and MFA degrees from Kent State University. He established New York City based office, Office of Paul Sahre, in 1997 and the office sits above a Dunkin' Donuts on the corner of 6th Avenue and 14th Street in Manhattan.

Sahre's designs for book covers are well-known and includes series by the authors Rick Moody, Ernest Hemingway and Chuck Klosterman. He is a frequent contributor of illustrations to The New York Times, and designed the typeface Fur in 1994. Sahre has also provided illustrations for The Atlantic and Newsweek.

Sahre teaches graphic design at the School of Visual Arts in New York City.

Personal life
Sahre is married to Emily Oberman, designer and partner at Pentagram. They have two sons.

Bibliography
 Fresh Dialogue 1, New Voices in Graphic Design, Christoph Niemann, Nicholas Blechman, Paul Sahre, Paula Scher), Princeton Architectural Press, 2000.
 Hello World: A Life in Ham Radio, Danny Gregory, Paul Sahre, Princeton Architectural Press, 2003.
 Leisurama Now: The Beach House for Everyone 1964–, Paul Sahre, Princeton Architectural Press, 2008.
Two-Dimensional Man A Graphic Memoir Abrams Press, 2017

References

External links
 Sahre's website
 The Education of Paul Sahre: Part II, July/August 2005'' 
 Illustrated profile of Sahre online at From Your Desks
 Under Cover and Eating the Dinosaur, online at The New Yorker

1964 births
American graphic designers
Artists from New York City
Living people
People from Johnson City, New York